John Francis Kinney (June 11, 1937 – September 27, 2019) was an American prelate of the Roman Catholic Church. He served as the ninth bishop of the Diocese of St. Cloud in Minnesota from 1995 to 2013.  

Kinney previously served as the fifth bishop of the Diocese of Bismarck in North Dakota from 1982 to 1995 and as an auxiliary bishop of the Archdiocese of Saint Paul and Minneapolis in Minnesota from 1976 to 1982.

Biography

Early life 
John Kinney was born on June 11, 1937, in Oelwein, Iowa, to John and Marie (née McCarty) Kinney. He received his primary education at St. Thomas Elementary School in Winona, Minnesota, and Annunciation Elementary School in Minneapolis. Kinney attended DeLaSalle High School in Minneapolis before entering Nazareth Hall Seminary in St. Paul. Kinney graduated from St. Paul Seminary in St. Paul in 1963.

Priesthood 
Kinney was ordained to the priesthood by Archbishop Leo Binz on February 2, 1963, in the Cathedral of Saint Paul.  After his ordination, Kinney was appointed assistant pastor of St. Thomas Parish in Minneapolis.  He was named vice-chancellor of the archdiocese in 1966. From 1968 to 1971, Kinney completed his graduate studies at the Pontifical Lateran University in Rome, obtaining a doctorate in canon law. 

After returning to Minnesota, he resumed his post as vice-chancellor, rising to become full chancellor in 1973. He also served as pastor of St. Leonard of Port Maurice Parish in Minneapolis

Auxiliary Bishop of St. Paul-Minneapolis 
On November 9, 1976, Kinney was appointed as an auxiliary bishop of the Archdiocese of St. Paul-Minneapolis and Titular Bishop of Caprulae by Pope Paul VI. He received his episcopal consecration on January 25, 1977 from Archbishop John Roach, with Archbishop Binz and Bishop James Ham serving as co-consecrators, in the Basilica of Saint Mary. Kinney served as archdiocesan vicar for parishes from 1979 to 1982.

Bishop of Bismarck 
Kinney was named by Pope John Paul II as the fifth Bishop of Bismarck, North Dakota, on June 28, 1982, and was installed on August 23 1982. He was a board member of Catholic Relief Services from 1993 to 1998. 

At the US Conference of Catholic Bishops (UCCB) in 1993, Kinney headed a new committee on sexual abuse allegations that was named "Uncomfortable Listening".  Kinney made these remarks:"I want to make sure that all of us bishops understand the depth and seriousness, the pain and the agony of this problem, and why it strikes at the very heart of the church's trust level and credibility."

Bishop of St. Cloud 
John Paul II appointed Kinney as the ninth bishop of the Diocese of St. Cloud on May 9, 1995, being installed on July 6 1995.

Within the USCCB, Kinney sat on the Committee for Priestly Life and Ministry, Committee on Migration, and the USCCB's Administrative Committee. He chaired the Ad Hoc Committee on Bishops' Life and Ministry, Ad Hoc Committee on Sexual Abuse, and Committee on Permanent Diaconate.

Retirement and legacy 
On September 20, 2013 Pope Francis accepted Kinney's resignation as bishop of St. Cloud.  Bishop Donald Kettler of Fairbanks was appointed his successor on the same day. Kinney died on September 27, 2019, in St. Cloud, Minnesota, at age 82.

See also
 

 Catholic Church hierarchy
 Catholic Church in the United States
 Historical list of the Catholic bishops of the United States
 List of Catholic bishops of the United States
 Lists of patriarchs, archbishops, and bishops

References

External links
Roman Catholic Diocese of Saint Cloud Official Site
Catholic-Hierarchy
Diocese of St. Cloud

Episcopal succession

1937 births
2019 deaths
University of St. Thomas (Minnesota) alumni
Roman Catholic Archdiocese of Saint Paul and Minneapolis
People from Oelwein, Iowa
Roman Catholic bishops of Bismarck
Roman Catholic bishops of Saint Cloud
20th-century Roman Catholic bishops in the United States
21st-century Roman Catholic bishops in the United States
Catholics from Iowa
DeLaSalle High School (Minneapolis) alumni